Nanorana ercepeae (common names: torrent paa frog, R.C.P.'s paa frog) is a species of frog in the family Dicroglossidae. It is endemic to western Nepal.
This relatively rare frog is found in stream habitats in upland temperate rainforests. It is threatened by habitat loss and degradation caused by small-scale agricultural development and wood extraction.

References

ercepeae
Amphibians of Nepal
Endemic fauna of Nepal
Taxonomy articles created by Polbot
Amphibians described in 1974